Lisburn Cricket Club is a cricket club in Lisburn, County Antrim, Northern Ireland, playing in the Premier League of the NCU Senior League.

Established in 1836, the club is the oldest in Northern Ireland. It is also one of the most successful, having won the league title eleven times and the Senior Cup on nine occasions. The club's grounds are at Wallace Park in Lisburn.

Notable former players
 men's internationals

 men's internationals
 Faiz Fazal
 rugby union internationals
 Neil Doak
 Ian Whitten
 Ireland U21 rugby union international
 Mike McComish
 field hockey internationals
 Jonathan Bell
 Tim Cockram
 Jimmy Kirkwood
 Nelson Russell
 field hockey international
 Jimmy Kirkwood
Recipients of the Military Cross
 Nelson Russell

Honours
NCU Senior League: 14 (2 shared)
1933, 1937, 1941, 1942, 1950, 1951, 1952, 1963 (shared), 1964, 1980, 1993, 1996 (shared), 2022
NCU Challenge Cup: 11 (2 shared)
1929, 1942, 1946, 1955, 1957, 1958 (shared), 1959, 1961, 1962, 1985, 1994 (shared)
Ulster Cup: 1
2000
NCU Junior Cup: †8
†1903, †1933, †1947, †1958, †1959, †1964, †1992, †2016

† Won by 2nd XI

External links
Official website

References

Cricket clubs in County Antrim
1836 establishments in Ireland
Cricket clubs established in 1836
Sport in Lisburn
NCU Senior League members
Cricket clubs in Northern Ireland